Hey, You is the debut EP of Japanese band Mono. Karelia and L'America also appear on their second album, Under The Pipal Tree.

Track listing

References

2000 debut EPs
Mono (Japanese band) albums